Cologne is an unincorporated community in King and Queen County, Virginia, United States. Cologne is located at longitude -76.691 and latitude 37.531 and sits elevated at 105 feet.

References

Unincorporated communities in Virginia
Unincorporated communities in King and Queen County, Virginia